Ivan Crnojević was the lord of Zeta and Serbian leader from 1465 to 1490. Having formed an alliance with the Republic of Venice, he led the Serb resistance against the expanding Ottoman Empire He was successful at first but lost his realm in 1479. He resumed power in 1481 in Žabljak and soon founded Cetinje as the new capital of his state.

Early life
Ivan Crnojević was a member of the Crnojević noble family whose ancestry dates back from Serbian nobleman Đuraš Ilijić. He was born to father Stefan Crnojević and mother Mara Kastrioti. Ivan had two brothers, Andrija and Božidar. Ivan first married Gojislava, the sister of Albanian lord Gjergj Arianiti, and he also became related with titular Serbian Despot Stefan Branković through his wife Angelina, from the same family. Ivan's second wife was Mara, a sister of Stefan Vukčić Kosača. Ivan had four children, three sons and one daughter. Two of his sons were notable: Đurađ Crnojević and Staniša "Stanko" (Skenderbeg). When Ivan died in 1490 his son Đurađ succeeded him as the lord of Zeta until the Ottomans forced him to leave Zeta in 1496. In his youth Ivan took part in the raids against the domains of Stefan Vukčić Kosača, the duke of Saint Sava in Hum, and on one occasion (between 1442 and 1444) he was captured. While he was Herzog's hostage (not imprisoned, but in Herzog's service, to guarantee his father's loyalty) his father was unable to be completely independent from Kosača or to fully ally with Venetian Republic. Venice saw Stefan Crnojević as an important potential ally in their war against Serbian Despotate, so they tried to bring him closer by accepting his request to maintain a pressure on Kosača to release Ivan. Stefan was ready to do anything to have Ivan released from Kosača's captivity, so he complied with Venetian condition to allow them to suppress the rebellion in Grbalj. After Venetians brutally suppressed the rebellion in Grbalj they forced Kosača to reluctantly release Ivan to them and spent 120 ducats to buy him new clothes before handling him to his father.

Reign

Lord of Zeta 
In the beginning of his reign Ivan was at very bad relations with the Republic of Venice, whom he saw as occupiers of his cities. In return, the Venetians put a price on his head in 1465. But thanks to moves of the Stefan Vukčić and Skanderbeg, in 1466 he became a duke under payment from the Venetian Republic with the capital in Žabljak at Lake Skadar. His payment was quite fair, 1,200 ducats annually. In 1469 Ivan remarried, to Mara, the daughter of Stefan Vukčić.

Ivan Crnojević fought for the Venetians in their wars against the Ottoman Empire. The Venetian Captain of Upper Zeta and Duke was accepted thus in 1473 into the ranks of Venetian nobility. In 1474 he further honored his obligations and defended Skadar from an Ottoman attack. Ivan Crnojević had important role in the defense of the Skadar because he provided the connection with Kotor and supplied the city through Žabljak or Skadar Lake, fighting simultaneously against strong Ottoman forces. He transported men and woods from Kotor over the hills into Žabljak where he built fustas which surprised Ottomans at Skadar lake. During whole summer of 1474 Ivan Crnojević participated in military actions. He controlled the Skadar lake with three fustas and 15 smaller ships, which was very important because Venetian fleet (composed of 34 larger ships and about 100 smaller) was unable to sail further than St. Srđ. The Venetian Senate awarded Ivan with many presents and one war flag as sign of appreciation for his help during the siege.

After this success, Ivan planned to liberate Herzegovina from Ottoman occupation for his brother-in-law Duke Vladislav Hercegović. Conflicts came out over discussions regarding the future border between the realms of Zeta and Herzegovina, which allowed Sultan Mehmed II to take initiative and invade Zeta, and with Duke Stephen's help the Turks seized Ivan's throne of Žabljak in 1478. In 1477 Ottomans captured most of the territory of Zeta together with Žabljak and defeated main army of Ivan Crnojević late in 1477 or early 1478. Ivan moved to Obod (fortified by him in 1475) which was soon renamed to Rijeka Crnojevića and became a new capitol of his state.

Ottomans then concentrated their forces at Venetian held Skadar. They besieged it in May 1478. Ivan's forces, with Ragusan support, sailed over the lake and attacked Ottoman tents at night.

Venice ended sixteen-year war with Ottomans by signing the peace treaty with Ottomans. That way Venice sacrificed its ally Ivan Crnojević who was not included into the peace treaty and had to leave his Zeta and find a haven in Italy.

Return to Zeta 

After Sultan Mehmed II's death in May 1481, Ivan Crnojević disembarked near Dubrovnik in June 1481. Using the civil war that erupted between Mehmed's sons, Bayezid II and Cem, he restored control over Zeta and Žabljak with the help of the people that welcomed him gladly as a liberator and supported by forces under Skanderbeg's son Gjon Kastrioti II.

The new Ottoman sultan Bayezid accepted Ivan as his vassal. In order to guarantee his loyalty to the Sultan, Ivan sent his youngest son Staniša and several of his friends to the sultan's court in 1482.

The center of his renewed realm was at Obod above the Crnojević River. Wishing to preserve the realm of Zeta and its independence from the Ottomans because he didn't feel safe at the edge and the border, Ivan moved its capital deeper into the hills to a more easily defended location in the field of Cetinje at the foot of Mount Lovćen. He had his court built in 1482 and the monastery of the Mother of Christ in Cetinje as a personal endowment to the Serbian Orthodox Church in 1484, thus founding Cetinje as a town. His court and the monastery are the first recorded renessaince buildings in Montenegro. He also moved the seat of the Metropolitanate of Zeta to the Old Cetinje Monastery, where he was buried upon his death in 1490.

Legacy 

Ivan brought a range of legislative acts that were later of great importance for the legal and cultural history of a future Montenegro. He was succeeded by his son Đurađ Crnojević, who established one of the first Cyrillic printing houses in the Balkans. His youngest son Stanko converted to Islam and received the name Skender, hence he is also known as Skenderbeg Crnojević, and became the Ottoman sanjakbey of the Sanjak of Montenegro when it was established in 1514.

Ivan's last capital Cetinje, a town founded by him, became the capital of Prince-Bishopric of Montenegro at the end of the 17th century and remained the capital of Montenegro until today. The modern-day Cetinje Monastery was built between 1701 and 1704 on the site of the former Ivan's court. On the site of the monastery of the Mother of Christ built by Ivan, prince Nicholas built a new church in the 19th century, so called Court Church. In the 20th century the church went through several major reconstructions. During one of them Ivan's grave was found and his bones were moved to the bank safe. In 2010 Montenegrin government buried the bones of Ivan Crnojević in the Court Church, in a ceremony which was closed for the public.

Notes

References

Sources

 
 "Ivan Crnojević - najznačajnija ličnost crnogorske istorije" (text in Montenegrin language)

Regnal titles

15th-century births
1490 deaths
Medieval Serbia
Lords of Zeta
Republic of Venice nobility
Republic of Venice military personnel
Ivan
Venetian period in the history of Montenegro
Burials at Serbian Orthodox monasteries and churches